The Ghana Museums and Monuments Board (GMMB) is the legal organisation responsible for the  preservation of Ghana's material cultural heritage. It was founded on 5 March 1957, soon after Ghana became independent, by a merge of the National Museum and the Monuments and Relics Commission by Ordinance 20.

History 
The origins of the GMMB can be traced back to the establishment of an ethnographic museum at Achimota College (now the Achimota School) in 1929. Following the establishment of the University of Ghana (then known as the University of the Gold Coast) in 1948, the museum was transferred to the university's archaeology department. 

In 1952, the British colonial government established an "Interim Council of the National Museum of the Gold Coast". The council later merged with the Monuments and Relics Commission to create the modern GMMB.

References
Citations

Bibliography

External links
 

1957 establishments in Ghana
Heritage registers in Ghana